The Aleutian Trench (or Aleutian Trough) is an oceanic trench along a convergent plate boundary which runs along the southern coastline of Alaska and the Aleutian islands. It is classified as a "marginal trench" in the east as it runs along the margin of the continent. The subduction along the trench gives rise to the Aleutian Arc, a volcanic island arc, where it runs through the open sea west of the Alaska Peninsula. As a convergent plate boundary, the trench forms part of the boundary between two tectonic plates. Here, the Pacific Plate is being subducted under the North American Plate at a dip angle of nearly 45°.

Trench morphology
The north side of the trench slopes 3°–4° and the south side 1°–4°.

Center pressure: . Variations in total magnetic intensity (residual) of more than 600 γ (600 nanoteslas) were found in the center of the trench and more than 1100 γ on the southern flank.

Associated seismicity
The subduction of the Pacific Plate below the North American Plate along the Aleutian Trench is associated with numerous earthquakes. Several of these earthquakes are notable for their size and/or associated tsunamis.

June 10–11, 1585 Aleutian Islands earthquake: A misdated tsunami legend in the Sanriku coast of Japan was dismissed and inferred to be from a vaguely–documented tsunami event in Miyagi Prefecture on June 11, 1585. Evidence of a large tsunami in the 16th century was also discovered in the Hawaiian Islands in the form of deposits. Oral records from the native residents described a tsunami-like event killing many people. Modelling of a tsunami from an earthquake of 9.25  in the Aleutian Islands proved consistent with the descriptions and paleotsunami evidences.
April 1, 1946 Aleutian Islands earthquake: This magnitude 8.6 earthquake occurred offshore Unimak Island, and caused only minor damage on land. However, the shaking generated a tsunami which killed 5 US Coast Guard personnel on the island, destroying the Scotch Cap Light, and causing damage on other Aleutian Islands and North and South America. In Hilo, Hawaii, the tsunami killed 159 and caused extensive damage. 
March 9, 1957 Andreanof Islands earthquake: This magnitude 8.6 earthquake occurred south of the Andreanof Islands. The earthquake itself caused damage on Adak Island and Umnak Island and generated a Pacific-wide tsunami. The tsunami destroyed two villages in the Hawaiian Islands. The tsunami was recorded as far away as Chile.
Most damage directly from the earthquake was in Anchorage, Alaska and the surrounding areas; a Pacific-wide tsunami caused destruction as far away as Crescent City, California. The death toll from both earthquake and tsunami was 131.
February 4 1965 Rat Islands earthquake: This magnitude 8.7 earthquake triggered a tsunami that struck Shemya Island and was observed around the Pacific, but caused little damage.
May 7, 1986 Andreanof Islands earthquake: This magnitude 7.9 earthquake caused damage on Adak Island and Atka Island. The resultant tsunami was recorded throughout the Pacific.
On June 23, 2014, a 7.9 quake occurred near Little Sitkin Island, Alaska.
On July 17, 2017, a magnitude 7.7 quake occurred  ESE of Nikol'skoye, Russia.
On January 23, 2018 Gulf of Alaska earthquake: a magnitude 7.9 quake occurred  Southeast of Kodiak, Alaska.
On July 28, 2021, a magnitude 8.2 earthquake occurred 104 km SE of Perryville, Alaska

References

External links
A New Perspective on Seismic Hazards in the Shumagin Gap – Alaska Earthquake Center

Landforms of Russia
Landforms of Alaska
Oceanic trenches of the Pacific Ocean
Subduction zones